El Greco (1541–1614) was a Greek painter, sculptor, and architect of the Spanish Renaissance. 

El Greco may also refer to:

 The artistic style (Art of El Greco) which El Greco pioneered (typically used as an adjective in quotations)
 El Greco (1966 film), by Luciano Salce
 El Greco (2007 film), by Yannis Smaragdis
 El Greco (album), a 1998 album by Vangelis
 El Greco (soundtrack), a 2007 album by Vangelis with the score to the film by Yannis Smaragdis
 El Greco (typeface)

See also
 El Greco Museum, Toledo, Spain
 El Greco Apartments, Los Angeles, California, on the National Register of Historic Places